The Catalan Republic was a state proclaimed in 1931 by Francesc Macià as the "Catalan Republic within the Iberian Federation", in the context of the proclamation of the Second Spanish Republic. It was proclaimed on 14 April 1931, and superseded three days later, on 17 April, by the Generalitat de Catalunya, the Catalan institution of self-government within the Spanish Republic.

History

After the Dictatorship of Primo de Rivera, Spanish republican parties agreed through the Pact of San Sebastián (17 August 1930) to prepare for a change of regime in case of victories in upcoming elections. In this project, there was a provision for the political autonomy of Catalonia, within the Spanish Republic. On 12 April 1931,  local elections gave a large and unexpected majority in Catalonia (including Barcelona) to the Republican Left of Catalonia (ERC), a party that had been founded three weeks earlier by the union of the independentist Estat Català and the Catalan Republican Party. Two days later (14 April), few hours before the proclamation of the Second Spanish Republic in Madrid, ERC's leader, Francesc Macià, proclaimed the "Catalan Republic" from the balcony of the Palace of the Generalitat (then the seat of the Provincial Deputation of Barcelona), "expecting that the other peoples of Spain would constitute themselves as republics, in order to establish an Iberian Confederation". The proclamation of Macià was preceded by a proclamation of the Spanish Republic by another ERC member, Lluís Companys, from the balcony of the City Hall, and the Catalan and Spanish Republican flags were hoisted from the balcony. Francesc Macià proclaimed himself president of Catalonia, and ratified in this position by the elected councillors of Barcelona.

Macià immediately dismissed General , chief of the Spanish Army in Catalonia, appointing in his place General López Ochoa, who was loyal to the new republican government, while Companys was designated civil governor of Barcelona and Jaume Aiguader became mayor of Barcelona. The jurist  was appointed president of the Territorial Audience of Barcelona (the highest court of justice in Catalonia at the time). Helped by socialist Manuel Serra i Moret, he also appointed the ministers of the Catalan government, dominated by the Republican Left of Catalonia. He included among his ministers a member of the Radical Republican Party, a member of the UGT trade union, a member of Acció Catalana, as well as two representatives from the Socialist Union of Catalonia, but none from the previously hegemonic and conservative Regionalist League. (In the streets many citizens clamored against the leader of the League, chanting "Long live Macià and death to Cambó!"). Macià even offered a ministry to the anarchist trade union CNT, but the anarcho-syndicalist organization finally refused to participate, claiming its traditional apoliticism.

The provisional government of the Catalan Republic was made up of:

 President: Francesc Macià (Republican Left of Catalonia)
 Minister of Politics: Ventura Gassol (Republican Left of Catalonia)
 Minister of Instruction:  (Socialist Union of Catalonia)
 Minister of Defence:  (Republican Left of Catalonia)
 Minister of the Treasury:  (Radical Republican Party)
 Minister of Economy and Work:  (Socialist Union of Catalonia)
 Minister of Communications: Manuel Carrasco i Formiguera (Catalan Action)
 Minister of Public Works:  (Unión General de Trabajadores)

The next steps of the new Catalan Government involved taking control of the territory. It ordered every municipality in Catalonia to ensure the proclamation of the Republic. It also appointed delegates of the government in the provinces of Girona, Lleida and Tarragona. A volunteer militia, the Civic Republican Guard (Catalan: Guàrdia Cívica Republicana) was raised in order to protect the Palace of the Generalitat and the sourrondings. On 15 April, a decree making Catalan the official language was passed. On 16 April, the first issue of the Official Journal of the Catalan Republic (Diari Oficial de la República Catalana) was published.

On 17 April, three days after the proclamation, the provisional government of the new Spanish Republic, concerned about this proclamation and the duality of powers it created, sent three ministers (Fernando de los Ríos, Lluís Nicolau d'Olwer and ) to Barcelona in order to negotiate with Macià and the Catalan provisional government. After some hours of intense debates, Macià reached an agreement with the three ministers, in which the Catalan Republic was renamed the Generalitat of Catalonia (Catalan: Generalitat de Catalunya), becoming an autonomous government within the Spanish Republic, that would be granted a Statute of Autonomy after the elections for Spain's Parliament (Cortes Generales). Francesc Macià would become the President of the Generalitat of Catalonia (as acting until November 1932, when he was elected by the newly elected Parliament of Catalonia), a position he held until his death on 25 December 1933.

See also

 1931 in Catalonia
 1931 in Spain

References

Sources and bibliography 
 Sobrequés i Callicó, Jaume. Catalunya i la Segona República. Edicions d'Ara (Barcelona, 1983) 
 Pelegrí i Partegàs, Joan. Les primeres 72 hores de la República Catalana. Fundació President Macià (Barcelona, 1993) 
 Roglan, Joaquim. 14 d'abril: la Catalunya republicana (1931-1939). Cossetània Edicions (2006)

External links 
 Third Catalan Republic in The New York Times
 República catalana i Generalitat republicana. Una reconsideració historiogràfica i política raco.cat
 Así vivió 'La Vanguardia' la proclamación de la República Catalana La Vanguardia.com

States and territories established in 1931
States and territories disestablished in 1931
History of Catalonia
Politics of Catalonia
Former republics
1931 in Catalonia
Former countries in Spanish history
Federalism in Spain